John Francis Brady (born January 8, 1954) is an American chemical engineer and the Chevron Professor of Chemical Engineering and Mechanical Engineering at the California Institute of Technology.  He is a fluid mechanician and creator of the Stokesian dynamics method for simulating suspensions of spheres and ellipsoids in low Reynolds number flows. He is an elected fellow of the American Physical Society, a fellow of the Society of Rheology, as well as a member of the National Academy of Sciences, the National Academy of Engineering, and the American Academy of Arts and Sciences.

Education and career
Brady was educated in chemical engineering at the University of Pennsylvania (B.S. 1975), the University of Cambridge, England (Certificate of Postgraduate Study, 1976), and Stanford University (M.S. 1977 and Ph.D. 1981). He completed his dissertation entitled Inertial effects in closed cavity flows and their influence in drop breakup advised by Professor Andreas Acrivos.  Following his Ph.D, Brady was a NATO post-doctoral fellow at the Ecole Superiéure de Physique et de Chimie Industrielles, Paris, France (1980–81).

Following his research in France, Brady joined the faculty in chemical engineering at the Massachusetts Institute of Technology as an assistant professor in 1981. He moved in 1985 to the Division of Chemistry and Chemical Engineering at the California Institute of Technology, which has been his academic home since.

In 1999, Brady was elected a member of the National Academy of Engineering for his work in elucidating the basic mechanics of and developing methods for the simulation of multiphase flows.

Research contributions 
Brady is an expert in the theory and simulations of fluid mechanics, rheology, and transport phenomena. He has made significant research contributions in the understanding of active matter and suspensions.  Among his many accomplishments is the creation of Stokesian dynamics with Georges Bossis. The Stokesian dynamics method allows the accurate and rapid simulation of the dynamics and rheology of suspensions of spherical particles at low Reynolds number. The technique has been used by researchers world-wide to model suspensions and understand a variety of physical systems. Brady and collaborators discovered the micromechanical "swim pressure" that contributes to the unique self-assembly and phase separation in a broad class of active matter.

Brady was an associate editor of the Journal of Fluid Mechanics (1990-2004) and the editor of the Journal of Rheology (2005-2012). According to Google Scholar, his publications have received over 19,000 citations and his h-index is 68.

Awards and honors
He has received numerous awards and honors which include:
 Election to the National Academy of Sciences (2020)
 Fellow of the Society of Rheology (2015)
 American Academy of Arts and Sciences (2014)
 Fluid Dynamics Prize (APS) (2011)
 Bingham Medal Society of Rheology (2007)
 Election to the National Academy of Engineering (1999)
 Professional Progress Award, AIChE (1998)
 Fellow of the American Physical Society (1994)
 ASEE Curtis W. McGraw Research Award (1993)
 Joliot-Curie Professor, ESPCI Paris, France (1988), (1996)
 Camille and Henry Dreyfus Teacher-Scholar Award (1986)
 Presidential Young Investigator Award, National Science Foundation (1985)

Selected publications

External links

Living people
1954 births
California Institute of Technology faculty
University of Pennsylvania School of Engineering and Applied Science alumni
Alumni of the University of Cambridge
MIT School of Engineering faculty
Stanford University School of Engineering alumni
American chemical engineers
Fluid mechanics
Members of the United States National Academy of Sciences